Haunted Forest is a 2017 Filipino supernatural horror film directed by Ian Loreños, and starring Jane Oineza, Maris Racal, Jameson Blake and Jon Lucas. It tells the story of a teenager who is forced to leave her life behind when her estranged policeman father is reassigned to the province. The film deals with supernatural mythical creatures, among them is the "sitsit," a creature that preys on women at night and is believed to be the cause of sudden disappearances and deaths of women in the subject town.
 
Haunted Forest was released in Philippine cinemas as an official entry to the 43rd Metro Manila Film Festival, on December 25, 2017.

Plot
The story revolves around Aris (Raymart Santiago) and his estranged daughter, Nica (Jane Oineza). When Aris was reassigned, he immediately starts on a case investigating a murder which is staged similarly to the death of a childhood friend that haunts him. While her father is away, Nica, her cousin and her local friends went for an outing where she started to get weird things happen to her. She tries to shake it off at first, but it gets worse day after day.

Cast

Main Cast
Jane Oineza as Nica
Jameson Blake as RJ
Maris Racal as Mich
Jon Lucas as Andre

Supporting Cast
Raymart Santiago as Aris
Joey Marquez as Nardo
Jerald Napoles
Myrtle Sarrosa as Lorena
Miho Nishida
Betong Sumaya
Beverly Salviejo as Merly
Fiona Yang
Kelvin Miranda

Production
Haunted Forest was produced under Regal Films and is directed by Ian Loreños. Loreños described the direction of the film as a mixture of Regal Film's "usual style" on horror and his own take on the genre. He said that the production team decided to put more "organic horror" elements in the film aside from relying on scaring the audience by surprise while adding that the film had "story" and "lessons". He stated that his film as an all-in-one film being a horror, family story, and love story while making sure the film won't have the impression of being a "mishmash".

Release
An official trailer for Haunted Forest was released by December 4, 2017. The film was premiered in cinemas on December 25, 2017, as one of the eight entries of the 2017 Metro Manila Film Festival.

Reception
On January 4, 2018, Lily Monteverde of Regal Films was satisfied of the box office gross of the film despite describing the then undisclosed figure as "not overwhelming".

See also
 List of ghost films

References

External links
 

2017 films
Philippine haunted house films
Philippine ghost films
Philippine supernatural horror films
Philippine teen horror films
Regal Entertainment films
2017 horror films
Philippine horror films
Films directed by Ian Loreños